The 2004 Bayern Rundfahrt was the 25th edition of the Bayern Rundfahrt cycle race and was held on 19 May to 23 May 2004. The race started in Selb and finished in Burghausen. The race was won by Jens Voigt.

General classification

References

Bayern-Rundfahrt
2004 in German sport